Shohjahon Ergashev (born 12 December 1991) is an Uzbek  professional boxer.

Background 
Ergashev was born in Fergana, Uzbekistan. He was representing the National Team of Uzbekistan; his coach saw excellent results and talent in him and decided to check into professional boxing.

Career 
Ergashev fought 9 professional fights, all of which ended before stoppage time, in Russia and then signed up for Salita promotions and subsequently moved to the US. In the US he had 2 successful fights against Marquis Hawthorne and Sonny Fredrickson where, he won both fights via technical knockout.

On April 28, 2018,  Ergashev is expected to fight Zhimin Wang from China for vacant World Boxing Council (WBC) International belt. Ergashev won the bout via  unanimous decision.
Occupies in Floyd Mayweather's "Mayweather promotion".

Professional boxing record

References

External links
 
  Shohjahon Ergashev @ Salita Promotions

Living people
1991 births
Uzbekistani male boxers
Light-welterweight boxers